Luis de Garrido Talavera (born 1995) is a Spanish architect working in sustainable architecture in Spain.

Biography
Luis de Garrido studied architecture in the UPV Polytechnic University of Valencia where he graduated with a doctorate. He also completed a master's degree in Urban Design at the (Polytechnic University of Catalonia).

He has taught a range of subjects at the information technology faculty at the Polytechnic University of Valencia (UPV), the information technology faculty at the Polytechnic University of Catalonia (UPC), in the school of telecommunications.  Universitat Ramón Llull (URL), Barcelona, at the architectural school at the Polytechnic University of Valencia (UPV) and at the architectural school at the Polytechnic University of Catalonia (UPC).

Luis de Garrido directs an architectural firm "Luis De Garrido Architects", in Valencia, Spain, which is involved in green architecture. He has designed houses for celebrities including supermodel Naomi Campbell and footballer Lionel Messi.

External links
Webpage for Luis De Garrido

References

1960 births
Spanish architects
Academic staff of University Ramon Llull
Academic staff of Paris-Sud University
Living people